Antonio Juan Marcos Villarreal (born May 12, 1976) is a Mexican politician and businessman, member of the Institutional Revolutionary Party and Coahuila's congressman.

Biography 
Born in Torreón, Coahuila. Son of the politician and congressman Salomón Juan Marcos Issa and Rocío Villarreal Asunsolo. His family is one of the most important in the textile industry of Torreón, Coahuila. He earned a bachelor's degree in Business Management at the Instituto Tecnológico de Estudios Superiores de Monterrey in 1999. He has been affiliated with the Institutional Revolutionary Party since he was 18 years old.

He was president of the National Chamber of Cloth Industry in the Laguna delegation and president of the Consejo Lagunero de la Iniciativa Privada and other non-profit organizations.

He was advisor in the National Commission of Mexican Transportation and in the non-profit association "Fíjate en La Laguna".

Politics
In his career as a politician he was a deputy in State Congress of Coahuila during 2005. In 2009 was Director of Non-Centralized Organisms and the Secretary of Regional Development of La Laguna. In 2011, was elected representative of the VII Local District of Coahuila, and so became member of the LIX Legislatura of this state.

See also 
 Antonio Juan Marcos Issa
 Salomon Juan Marcos Issa

Notes 

1976 births
Living people
Politicians from Torreón
Members of the Congress of Coahuila
Mexican people of Arab descent
Monterrey Institute of Technology and Higher Education alumni